Beautiful Wasteland is the seventh studio album by folk rock band Capercaillie.  It was reissued in North America by Valley Entertainment in 2002.

Track listing 
 "M'Ionam"
 "Inexile"
 "The Tree"
 "Am Mur Gorm (The Blue Rampart)"
 "Beautiful Wasteland"
 "Co Ni Mire Rium (Who Will Flirt With Me?)"
 "Shelter"
 "Hebridean Hale-Bopp"
 "Kepplehall/25 Kts"
 "Thiocfadh Leat Fanacht"
 "Finlay's"
 "Sardinia"

References 

Capercaillie (band) albums
1997 albums
Scottish Gaelic music